Simon Eldershaw (born 3 December 1983) is an English former professional footballer.

Career
Eldershaw started his career with Port Vale, joining the club's centre of excellence at the age of seven after being scouted by Jim Cooper. He scored his first senior goal for the "Valiants" in a 2–1 defeat at Huddersfield Town on Boxing Day 2004. He was only to make 15 appearances though, before being released by manager Martin Foyle in May 2005.

Following his release he had a trial with Kidderminster Harriers, before having spells with local non-league teams Northwich Victoria, Leek Town, Nantwich Town, Alsager Town and Newcastle Town. He turned out in two league and one FA Cup qualifier game for Kidsgrove Athletic in the 2008–09 season.

He graduated from the Open University with a degree in IT. He became a teacher, and taught in the IT Department at St Thomas More Catholic Academy in Stoke-on-Trent. He later became a teacher at Alleyne's High School in Stone, Staffordshire, also playing for local non-league team Stone Dominoes from August 2009. Stone finished as champions of the North West Counties League Division One in 2009–10, before retraining their Premier Division status in 2010–11 and 2011–12.

Career statistics
Source:

Honours
Stone Dominoes
North West Counties Football League Division One: 2009–10

References

1983 births
Living people
Footballers from Stoke-on-Trent
English footballers
Association football forwards
Port Vale F.C. players
Northwich Victoria F.C. players
Leek Town F.C. players
Nantwich Town F.C. players
Alsager Town F.C. players
Newcastle Town F.C. players
Kidsgrove Athletic F.C. players
Stone Dominoes F.C. players
English Football League players
Northern Premier League players
Schoolteachers from Staffordshire
Alumni of the Open University
Computer science educators